Godfrey Brown may refer to:

Godfrey Brown (politician) (–1928), British businessman and politician of Hawaii
Godfrey Brown (athlete) (1915–1995), British Olympic gold medallist